Bermudo III or Vermudo III (c. 1015– 4 September 1037) was the king of León from 1028 until his death. He was a son of Alfonso V of León by his first wife Elvira Menéndez, and was the last scion of Peter of Cantabria to rule in the Leonese kingdom. Like several of his predecessors, he sometimes carried the imperial title: in 1030 he appears as regni imperii Ueremundo principis; in 1029/1032 as imperator domnus Veremudius in Gallecia; and in 1034 as regni imperii Veremundus rex Legionensis.  He was a child when he succeeded his father. In 1034 he was chased from his throne by King Sancho III of Pamplona and forced to take refuge in Galicia. He returned to power, but was defeated and killed fighting against his brother-in-law, Ferdinand of Castile, in the battle of Tamarón.

History

Bermudo III was the son of Alfonso V of León by his first wife Elvira Menéndez. He succeeded to the throne of León in 1027. Bermudo married Jimena Sánchez, who was a daughter of King Sancho III of Pamplona.

In 1029, Count García Sánchez of Castile was about to be married to Sancha of León, the elder sister of Bermudo, an arrangement apparently sanctioned by the king of Navarre, when the count was murdered in the city of León by the Velas, a party of Castilian nobles exiled from their own country, who had taken refuge in Leon. Leon and Navarre disputed the succession to the Countship of Castile thus left vacant.

Sancho III of Pamplona was married to Muniadona, daughter of Sancho García of Castile, and sister to the murdered count. Sancho claimed the county of Castile in his wife's name and installed in it their son, Ferdinand, as the new count of Castile. He seized the borderlands between the Cea and the Pisuerga rivers, right above León's capital, long a bone of contention between León and Castile. In 1032 Sancho of Pamplona forced a marriage between his son, Fernando of Castile, and Sancha of León, and those lands went to Castile as part of her dowry.

In 1034, Sancho wrested the city of León itself from his son-in-law, Bermudo, who retreated into Galicia. By the time Sancho died in 1035, the meseta north of the Duero was dominated by the Pyrenean pocket kingdom of Navarre.  After Sancho's death, Bermudo III was immediately received back into León and soon began a campaign to recover the disputed territory between the Cea and Pisuerga from Castile and his brother-in-law Ferdinand. Bermudo III was killed at the Battle of Tamarón on 4 September 1037.  Autopsy of his remains shows that he may have suffered death from infantry spears or pikes, after falling from his horse.

Since the latter died without an heir, the kingdom of León now recognized Sancha and her husband as its rulers, and Ferdinand was anointed king in the royal city on 22 June 1038. 
The united realm of León and Castile, with its rimlands of Asturias and Galicia, would become the political center of the north Iberian Christian society.

Marriage

By his wife Jimena, daughter of Sancho III of Pamplona, Bermudo had one child, a son named Alfonso, who was born and died in 1030.

See also
Labio Castle

References

Bibliography

External links

11th-century Leonese monarchs
1010s births
1037 deaths
Spanish military personnel killed in action
Astur-Leonese dynasty
Monarchs killed in action
Burials in the Royal Pantheon at the Basilica of San Isidoro
Sons of emperors